Hamad Mohammad Al-Asmar is a Jordanian footballer who plays for Shabab Al-Aqaba.

References

External links
 
 eurosport.com
 Profile at Goal.com 

1987 births
Living people
Jordanian footballers
Jordan international footballers
Jordan youth international footballers
Jordanian people of Palestinian descent
Association football goalkeepers
Sportspeople from Amman
Jordanian Pro League players
Al-Hussein SC (Irbid) players
Al-Jazeera (Jordan) players
Mansheyat Bani Hasan players
Al-Wehdat SC players
Kufrsoum SC players
Al-Ahli SC (Amman) players
Shabab Al-Aqaba Club players